Asb Khan (also Romanized as Asb Khān; also known as Asp-e Khān and Aspikhan) is a village in Bedevostan-e Sharqi Rural District, in the Central District of Heris County, East Azerbaijan Province, Iran. At the 2006 census, its population was 103, in 24 families.

References 

Populated places in Heris County